Ratkovo is a rural locality (a village) in Krasnoplamenskoye Rural Settlement, Alexandrovsky District, Vladimir Oblast, Russia. The population was 52 as of 2010. There are 4 streets.

Geography 
Ratkovo is located on the Dubna River, 36 km northwest of Alexandrov (the district's administrative centre) by road. Iskra is the nearest rural locality.

References 

Rural localities in Alexandrovsky District, Vladimir Oblast